The Pinehills is a census-designated place (CDP) located in the Pine Hills region of Plymouth, Massachusetts, United States. At the 2010 census, the population was 955. It includes a real estate development that bears the same name. As of 2008, the project is the largest new residential and commercial development in New England. Already, over 500,000 square feet of mixed-use space exists in the Village Green. The community now consists of over 2,000 single-family homes, apartments and condominiums, two daily fee public golf courses, a private golf club, and the Village Green, a commercial center with a grocery store, restaurants, US Post Office, shops and professional and medical services.

Homes in The Pinehills are organized into nearly 40 neighborhoods. Neighborhoods have different builders and home styles: from cottage homes to custom homes to condominium townhomes to luxury apartment rentals.   Homes are designed by eleven different builders, including Polhemus Savery DaSilva Architects Builders, The Green Company, Kistler and Knapp, Design Housing, Pulte Homes, Whitman Homes, MacKenzie Brothers, Toll Brothers, Barefoot Cottage Company, The Hanover Company, and AvalonBay Communities, Inc.

The Pinehills is also home to Mirbeau Inn & Spa. This is the second Mirbeau in the U.S., with the first in the Finger Lakes region of New York State.  Mirbeau is known for its spa treatments and beautiful architecture and design. Surrounding the Inn are Monet-inspired pond gardens.

80 residences offering assisted living and memory care for seniors are part of Laurelwood at The Pinehills, by Northbridge Companies.

Geography
According to the United States Census Bureau, the CDP has a total area of 1.1 mi² (2.9 km), all land.

Demographics

The Village Green

The Village Green is the commercial center of the Pinehills. It consists of Mirbeau Inn & Spa, The Market at The Pinehills, several shops including a salon, a restaurant, a post office, a wine and spirits shop, several medical service centers, offices, and a TD Bank branch. A gas station opened in the spring of 2012. A fire station is also located within The Pinehills.  Rye Tavern, which is located on the oldest continuous road in the U.S. (Old Sandwich Road), is a restaurant within The Pinehills.

Golf courses
The Pinehills is home to Pinehills Golf Club which contains two public, daily-fee 18-hole golf courses situated among the residential neighborhoods. The courses are titled the "Nicklaus Course" and the "Rees Jones Course", and both are consistently ranked among the top golf courses in the United States. The community also contains a private club, Old Sandwich Golf Club, featuring a golf course designed by Bill Coore and Ben Crenshaw.

See also
 Neighborhoods in Plymouth, Massachusetts
 Colony Place
 The Shops at 5

References

External links
 The Pinehills official website

Plymouth, Massachusetts
Neighborhoods in Plymouth, Massachusetts
Geography of Plymouth County, Massachusetts